Makati's 1st congressional district is one of the two congressional districts of the Philippines in the city of Makati. It has been represented in the House of Representatives of the Philippines since 1998. The district consists of barangays in western Makati, namely Bangkal, Bel-Air, Carmona, Dasmariñas, Forbes Park, Kasilawan, La Paz, Magallanes, Olympia, Palanan, Pio del Pilar, Poblacion, San Antonio, San Isidro, San Lorenzo, Santa Cruz, Singkamas, Tejeros and Urdaneta. It is currently represented in the 19th Congress by Romulo Peña Jr. of the Liberal Party (LP).

Representation history

Election results

2022

2019

2016

2013

2010

2007

See also
Legislative districts of Makati

References

Congressional districts of the Philippines
Politics of Makati
1995 establishments in the Philippines
Congressional districts of Metro Manila
Constituencies established in 1995